Jorge M. Pérez (born October 17, 1949) is an Argentine American billionaire real estate developer, art collector, and philanthropist. He is best known as the chairman and CEO of The Related Group. He is ranked 316th on the Forbes 400 list with a net worth of US$ 2.6 billion as of October, 2018, and 1,833rd on Forbes Billionaires list with US$1.7 billion as of November, 2021.

Early life and education
Pérez was born October 17, 1949 in Buenos Aires, Argentina to Cuban parents of Spanish origin. He lived in Colombia before moving to Miami in 1968. His father was the head of a pharmaceutical company that was nationalized by the Cuban government. He has a bachelor's degree in economics from Long Island University C.W. Post Campus, and a master's degree in urban planning from the University of Michigan.

Career
Pérez was an economic development director with the city of Miami before he entered the real estate business and became a developer. In 1979, he founded Related Group with New York builder Stephen M. Ross. Pérez built his fortune by building and operating low-income multifamily apartments across Miami. The firm became the largest affordable housing builder in Florida by the middle of the decade. He then branched off into rental apartments before becoming one of the most prolific high-rise condo builders in the Southern United States. Pérez has owned 50 condo towers in various stages of completion in South Florida, Fort Myers and Las Vegas. He has been called the "Donald Trump of the Tropics".

Related Group had $2.1 billion in revenue in 2004, putting Pérez at the top of the Hispanic Business 500 during this period of time. He is an active Democratic fund raiser; he advised Bill Clinton on Cuba during his presidency and was an active fundraiser for the failed presidential campaign of Senator Hillary Clinton. In 2008, he also hosted and raised money for Barack Obama after he became the Democratic presidential nominee.

On November 18, 2007, Related Group demolished the Sheraton at Bal Harbour to make way for a new project. The Sheraton at Bal Harbour, originally called the Americana, was created by architect Morris Lapidus, who also designed the Fontainebleau Miami Beach and Eden Roc hotels— buildings that had inspired Miami Modern Architecture (MiMo).

With the financial crisis of 2007–2010, many of Related Group's projects were in financial strife as buyers, many of whom were speculators, refused to settle on their apartments or banks refused to grant home or property investment loans to the buyers. As a separate business, Pérez set up a hedge fund to buy distressed real estate. Before the financial crisis of 2007, Forbes pegged his wealth at $1.3 billion. As of March 2013, his wealth stood at 1.2 billion with a steady resurgence in Florida real estate prices.

His firm has built projects in Argentina, Brazil, Panama, Uruguay and Mexico. The company has completed skyscraper condo projects including 50 Biscayne, Icon Brickell, Icon South Beach, Murano at Portofino and Paraiso Bay, among others.

In 2017, the company broke ground on a 400-unit luxury apartment project in Tampa, Florida and also plans to build more than 700 units in West Florida in coming years. The Related Group opened an office in 2017 in Dallas with plans to build apartments in Denver, Las Vegas, Phoenix and other major Texas markets. In 2018, the Related Group and Block Capital Group broke ground on a mixed-use development called the Bradley, a 175-unit apartment building in Miami. Kravitz Design, musician Lenny Kravitz's firm, will design the project's interior. The Related Group opened Icon Midtown, a high-rise apartment in the Midtown section of Atlanta, in 2018. It is Perez's first completed development in Georgia. Wynwood 25, a partnership between Perez and East End Capital, will deliver 289 rental apartments that will range in size from 400 to 1,200 square feet. Construction is scheduled for completion in 2019.

Personal life
Pérez lives in  Miami, Florida, with his wife, Darlene Pérez. He has four children. He is a friend and former business partner of President Donald Trump, who wrote the foreword for Pérez's 2008 book, Powerhouse Principles, although he has since been publicly critical of Trump's presidency.

In December 2011, Pérez donated $35 million in cash and art to the Miami Art Museum to support the construction of its Herzog & de Meuron designed building. The museum was renamed the Pérez Art Museum Miami (PAMM). He donated $15 million more to the museum in 2016. The donation included $5 million in Cuban contemporary art. He has pledged to donate his entire collection to the museum after his death.

In 2019, Pérez opened a new art space called El Espacio 23 in Miami’s Allapattah neighborhood. The 28,000-square-foot experimental art space shows curated exhibitions from the Pérez Collection. It is open to the public and admission is free. The building also houses three apartments reserved for artist and curator residency programs.

In September 2021, Pérez donated $33 million to The Miami Foundation, an organization committed to building a more prosperous Miami. The donation came from the proceeds of the sale of his 10,000-square-foot waterfront estate, known as “Villa Cristina.” The foundation will use the funds to support causes associated with arts, culture, education, and social justice.

Selected works 
 Powerhouse Principles: The Ultimate Blueprint for Real Estate Success in an Ever-Changing Market. New York: New American Library. 2008.

References

1950 births
21st-century philanthropists
Living people
American billionaires
American business writers
American people of Cuban descent
American philanthropists
American political fundraisers
American real estate businesspeople
Argentine emigrants to the United States
Argentine people of Cuban descent
Businesspeople from Miami
Florida Democrats
Giving Pledgers
Long Island University alumni
Taubman College of Architecture and Urban Planning alumni
Writers from Miami